The 1947 All-Ireland Senior Football Championship Final was the sixtieth All-Ireland Final and the deciding match of the 1947 All-Ireland Senior Football Championship, an inter-county Gaelic football tournament for the top teams in Ireland. Cavan were captained by John Joe O'Reilly.

Pre-game
For the first and only time, the final was played outside Ireland, at the Polo Grounds in New York City,  to cater for the large Irish-American community there. The New York final was also intended to observe the centenary of the Great Famine that triggered mass Irish emigration to the U.S. and other countries. Around 30,000 people were in the ground for the final. Cavan travelled by air and Kerry by sea; the Cavan team credited their victory partially to their shorter time spent travelling. The Cavan team flew via the Azores, taking 30 hours. Kerry's trip by Ocean Liner took far longer.

Mick Higgins, a key member of the Cavan team that day, recalled in later life: "There was no huge send-off for us in Cavan, but both teams got a good reception in New York when we arrived. I remember the team stayed in the Commodore Hotel, but I stayed with my relatives." He also remembered there was "oppressive heat" during the game itself.

The Artane Boys' Band travelled to New York to play before the match, as they do traditionally at all All-Ireland finals.

Match

Summary
After a slow start, Cavan fought back to lead 2–5 to 2–4 at the break and went on to win by four points. Peter Donohoe scored eight points from frees and was called "the Babe Ruth of Gaelic football" in the New York press. Michael O'Hehir broadcast radio commentary back across the Atlantic Ocean.

O'Hehir noticed that broadcasting delays would bring the radio link down five minutes before the final had ended. O'Hehir later recalled his plea:'"If there's anybody along the way there listening in, just give us five minutes more, and I kept begging for five minutes more". The link stayed open.

Details

Post-match
The Cavan team returned to Ireland aboard the RMS Queen Mary. Higgins recalled, "It was only after we arrived in Southampton that we realised the joy of it all. Large numbers of Cavan people turned up to see us in London and Birmingham. We were treated like kings in Cavan."

The 1947 All-Ireland final brought about an understanding that a large audience existed for Gaelic games highlights.

Mick Higgins, the last surviving member of the winning team, died in January 2010.

This was the last All-Ireland Senior Football Championship Final to be played on 14 September until the 2019 replay.

References

All-Ireland Senior Football Championship Final, 1947
All-Ireland Senior Football Championship Final
All-Ireland Senior Football Championship Final
All-Ireland Senior Football Championship Final
All-Ireland Senior Football Championship Finals
Cavan county football team matches
Kerry county football team matches
Sports competitions in New York City
Washington Heights, Manhattan